Bloodymania 6 was a professional wrestling pay-per-view (PPV) event produced by Juggalo Championship Wrestling (JCW), which was only available online. It took place at midnight on August 12, 2012 at Hog Rock in Cave-In-Rock, Illinois. Professional wrestling is a type of sports entertainment in which theatrical events are combined with a competitive sport. The buildup to the matches and the scenarios that took place before, during, and after the event, were planned by JCW's script writers. The event starred wrestlers from Juggalo Championship Wrestling's bi-weekly internet wrestling show.

Six matches were held on the event's card. The main event match was a JCW Heavyweight Championship match that featured the champion 2 Tuff Tony defeating Kongo Kong. Featured matches on the undercard included a tag team match where the team of Vader and Scott Steiner defeated Shaun Summers and Roderick Street, a singles match that saw Vampiro defeat Colt Cabana, and a 9-man Battle Royal match in which Zach Gowen was victorious.

Background
Bloodymania 6 featured professional wrestling matches that involved different wrestlers from pre-existing scripted feuds, plots, and storylines that were played at Juggalo Championship Wrestling's bi-weekly events. Wrestlers were portrayed as either villains or heroes as they followed a series of events that built tension, and culminated in a wrestling match or series of matches. The event featured wrestlers from Juggalo Championship Wrestling's roster.

Results

References

External links
Juggalo Championship Wrestling’s official website

2012 in professional wrestling
2012
Professional wrestling in Illinois
2012 in Illinois
Events in Illinois